The 58th Airlift Squadron is part of the 97th Air Mobility Wing at Altus Air Force Base, Oklahoma.  It operates C-17 Globemaster III aircraft training pilots for airlift and airdrop operations.

Mission
The 58 AS is responsible for providing pilot and loadmaster initial qualification and advanced upgrades for all United States active duty, reserve, and guard units.

History
Constituted as 58 Troop Carrier Squadron on 12 Nov 1942. Activated on 18 Nov 1942 with C-47s at Bowman Field, KY. The 58th conducted aerial transportation in Pacific Theater, and participated in the airborne assault on Nadzab, New Guinea, on 5 September 1943 during World War II.

The 58th were inactivated on 25 March 1946. Activated in the Reserve on 28 June 1947. Redesignated as 58 Troop Carrier Squadron, Medium, on 27 June 1949. Inactivated on 3 Oct 1950. Redesignated as 58 Military Airlift Squadron, Special, and activated, on 27 December 1965. Organized on 8 January 1966. Redesignated as 58 Military Airlift Squadron on 8 January 1967, operating C-141 Starlifters. Inactivated on 15 August 1971. Activated on 1 September 1977. Redesignated as 58 Airlift Squadron on 1 Jun 1992. Inactivated on 1 Oct 1993. Activated on 30 Jan 1996.

The 58th provided global airlift from 1966–1971 and from 1977–1993.  When it was organized in January 1966, it absorbed the personnel and equipment of the 7th Air Transport Squadron, Special.'

It has conducted C-17 aircrew training since 30 Jan 1996, when the stood-up as an Air Education and Training Command squadron. 

In September 2005, the 58th helped the victims in Louisiana form Hurricanes Katrina and Rita. They flew over 25 missions helping to supply essential equipment and supplies.

In 2008 the squadron was again called upon to perform multiple evacuations from the Gulf Coast ahead of Hurricanes Gustav and Ike. Sixty percent of the squadron members participated in the effort, flying 55 missions and moving over 1 million pounds of cargo and equipment while evacuating 315 personnel and 100 patients.

Lineage
 Constituted as the 58th Troop Carrier Squadron on 12 November 1942
 Activated on 18 November 1942
 Inactivated on 25 March 1946
 Activated in the Reserve on 28 June 1947
 Redesignated 58th Troop Carrier Squadron, Medium on 27 June 1949
 Inactivated on 3 October 1950
 Redesignated 58th Military Airlift Squadron, Special and activated on 27 December 1965 (not organized)
 Organized on 8 January 1966
 Redesignated 58th Military Airlift Squadron on 8 January 1967
 Inactivated on 15 August 1971
 Activated on 1 September 1977
 Redesignated 58th Airlift Squadron on 1 June 1992
 Inactivated on 1 October 1993
 Activated on 30 January 1996

Assignments
 375th Troop Carrier Group, 18 November 1942 – 25 March 1946
 Eleventh Air Force, 28 June 1947
 375th Troop Carrier Group, 30 September 1947 – 3 October 1950
 Military Air Transport Service (later Military Airlift Command), 27 December 1965 (not organized)
 63d Military Airlift Wing, 8 January 1966
 436th Military Airlift Wing, 1 July 1966 – 15 August 1971
 435th Tactical Airlift Wing, 1 September 1977
 322d Airlift Division, 23 June 1978
 608th Military Airlift Group, 1 August 1983
 86th Operations Group, 1 June 1992 – 1 October 1993
 97th Operations Group, 30 January 1996 – present

Stations

 Bowman Field, KY, 18 November 1942
 Sedalia AAFld, MO, 24 January 1943
 Laurinburg-Maxton AAB, NC, 6 May 1943
 Baer Field, IN, 1 – 17 June 1943
 Port Moresby, New Guinea, c. 10 July 1943
 Dobodura, New Guinea, 19 August 1943
 Port Moresby, New Guinea, 21 December 1943
 Nadzab, New Guinea, 22 April 1944
 Biak, 25 September 1944
 San Jose, Mindoro, 1 March 1945

 Porac, Luzon, 20 May 1945
 Okinawa, 20 August 1945
 Tachikawa, Japan, c. 20 September 1945 – 25 March 1946
 Youngstown Muni Airport, OH, 28 June 1947
 Greater Pittsburgh Airport, PA, 27 June 1949 – 3 October 1950
 Robins AFB, GA, 8 January 1966 – 15 August 1971
 Ramstein AB, Germany, 1 September 1977 – 1 October 1993
 Altus AFB, OK, 30 January 1996 – present

Aircraft

C-47 Skytrain (1942–1945)
B-17 Flying Fortress (1944)
C-46 Commando (1944–1946, 1949–1950)
AT-6 Harvard II (1948)
AT-11 Kansas (1948)
C-124 Globemaster II (1966–1967)
C-141 Starlifter (1967–1971)
VC-140 (1977–1986)

VC-135 (1977–1993)
CT-39 Sabreliner (1978–1983)
C-12 Huron (1978–1993)
C-21 (1984–1993)
C-20 (1987–1993)
T-43 (1988–1993)
C-17 Globemaster III (1996–Present)

Operations
World War II

References

Notes
 Explanatory notes

 Citations

58th Airlift Squadron Fact Sheet

Military units and formations in Oklahoma
058